Breaking into the Big League is a lost 1913 silent dramatic short film about baseball. It was produced by the Kalem Company and released through the General Film Company. This film is 2 reels in length and stars Harry Millarde and Marguerite Courtot.

It was filmed in Marlin, Texas and released in two parts.

Cast
Harry Millarde - Montjoy Jones
Marguerite Courtot - Mamie Wallace
Henry Hallam - Mr. Wallace, Mamie's Father
John J. McGraw - Himself
Christy Mathewson - Himself

See also
Casey at the Bat (1927)
Babe Comes Home (1927)

References

External links

Poster(Wayback Machine)

1913 films
1913 short films
1910s sports drama films
American silent short films
American black-and-white films
American baseball films
Kalem Company films
Lost American films
American sports drama films
1913 drama films
Lost sports drama films
1910s American films
Silent American drama films
1913 lost films
Silent sports drama films